Donald Hopkins (born January 9, 1952) is an American former professional baseball player. An outfielder during his minor league baseball career, he was used almost exclusively as a pinch runner by the  American League West Division champion Oakland Athletics.

A speedy baserunner, Hopkins stole over 40 bases four times in his minor league career, and was acquired the Athletics from Montreal just prior to the 1975 campaign. At the time, Oakland owner Charlie Finley — one of the early proponents of the designated hitter rule, adopted in the American League in  — was also advocating the creation of the "designated runner" in baseball, and he regularly employed fast players on his 25-man roster to specialize in pinch running. Hopkins fulfilled that role during the 1975 season. He appeared in 82 games, largely pinch-running for future Baseball Hall of Fame member and veteran Billy Williams, who was Oakland's designated hitter. Hopkins stole 21 bases and scored 25 runs, but had only eight plate appearances. He drew two bases on balls and collected one hit, a single, off the Detroit Tigers' Fernando Arroyo in a lopsided, 16–4 Oakland win on July 22.

Hopkins spent much of 1976 in the minor leagues, although he made three more pinch-running appearances for Oakland during September 1976. He retired after the 1977 minor-league season.

References

External links

1952 births
Living people
African-American baseball players
Baseball players from Michigan
Baseball players from Mississippi
Gulf Coast Expos players
Jamestown Expos players
Kinston Expos players
Major League Baseball outfielders
Memphis Blues players
Oakland Athletics players
Québec Carnavals players
San Jose Missions players
Tucson Toros players
Watertown Expos players
West Palm Beach Expos players
People from West Point, Mississippi
21st-century African-American people
20th-century African-American sportspeople